The 2012–13 Sacramento State Hornets men's basketball team represented California State University, Sacramento during the 2012–13 NCAA Division I men's basketball season. The Hornets were led by fifth year head coach Brian Katz and played their home games at Hornets Nest. They were members of the Big Sky Conference. They finished the season 14–15, 8–12 in Big Sky play to finish in a three way tie for sixth place. They failed to qualify for the Big Sky tournament.

Roster

Schedule

|-
!colspan=9| Exhibition 

|-
!colspan=9| Regular season

References

Sacramento State Hornets men's basketball seasons
Sacramento State